The 1991 Soviet football championship was the 60th seasons of competitive football in the Soviet Union. With the ongoing armed conflicts throughout the former Soviet Union (Moldova, Georgia, Tajikistan), the Army main football team, CSKA Moscow, won the Top League championship becoming the Soviet domestic champions for the seventh time. It became de facto the last full-scale season of the falling apart Soviet Union.

Honours

Notes = Number in parentheses is the times that club has won that honour. * indicates new record for competition

Soviet Union football championship

Top League

First League

Second League

West

Representation
 : 11
 : 4
  2
  2
  3

Center

East

Representation
 : 8
 : 6
 : 5
 : 1
 : 1
 : 1

Lower Second League

Group 1

Group 2

Group 3

Group 4

Group 5

Group 6

Group 7

Group 8

Group 9

Group 10

Top goalscorers

Top League
 Igor Kolyvanov (Dinamo Moscow) – 18 goals

First League
Serhiy Husyev (Tiligul Tiraspol) – 25 goals

References

External links
 1991 Soviet football championship. RSSSF